Ewa is a feminine given name in Eastern Europe and a feminine given name specifically in Poland, the Polish counterpart of English Eve or Latin Eva.

People with the name include:

Music 
 Ewa Biegas (born 1977), Polish soprano
 Ewa Demarczyk (born 1941), Polish singer
 Ewa Farna (born 1993), Polish pop-rock singer
 Ewa Kupiec (born 1964), Polish pianist
 Ewa Malas-Godlewska (born 1957), Polish soprano
 Ewa Plonka (born 1982), Polish mezzo-soprano
 Ewa Podleś (born 1952), Polish coloratura contralto
 Ewa Sonnet (born 1985), Polish model and singer
 Ewa Strusińska (born 1976), Polish conductor
 Schwesta Ewa (born 1984), German rapper

Politics 
 Ewa Björling (born 1961), Polish politician
 Ewa Janik (born 1948), Polish politician
 Ewa Kierzkowska (born 1964), Polish politician
 Ewa Klamt (born 1950), German politician
 Ewa Kopacz (born 1956), 15th Prime Minister of Poland
 Ewa Malik (born 1961), Polish politician
 Ewa Monika Mes (born 1951), Polish politician
 Ewa Sowińska (born 1944), Polish politician

Sport 
 Ewa Ambroziak (born 1950), Polish rower
 Ewa Brodnicka (born 1984), Polish boxer
 Ewa Durska (born 1977), Polish athlete
 Ewa Gryziecka (born 1948), Polish athlete
 Ewa Kasprzyk (born 1957), Polish sprinter
 Ewa Kłobukowska (born 1946), Polish sprinter
 Ewa Kuls-Kusyk (born 1991), Polish luger
 Ewa Laurance (born 1964), Swedish-American pool player
 Ewa Malewicka (1955–1995), Polish speed skater
 Ewa Mizdal (born 1987), Polish weightlifter
 Ewa Olliwier (1904–1955), Swedish diver
 Ewa Pajor (born 1996), Polish footballer
 Ewa Palies (born 1989), British handball player
 Ewa Piątkowska (born 1984), Polish boxer
 Ewa Rybak (born 1974), Polish javelin thrower
 Ewa Rydell (born 1942), Swedish gymnast
 Ewa Wasilewska (born 1967), Polish speed skater
 Ewa Wiśnierska (born 1971), German paraglider
 Ewa Zielińska (born 1972), Polish athlete

Television and film 
 Ewa Aulin (born 1950), Swedish actress and one time winner of Miss Teen Sweden
 Ewa Błaszczyk (born 1955), Polish actress
 Ewa Da Cruz (born 1976), Norwegian-American actress
 Ewa Dałkowska (born 1947), Polish actress
 Ewa Drzyzga (born 1967), Polish journalist and television personality
 Ewa Fröling (born 1952), Swedish actress
 Ewa Gawryluk (born 1967), Polish actress
 Ewa Kasprzyk (born 1957), Polish actress
 Ewa Krzyżewska (1939–2003), Polish actress
 Ewa Petelska (1920–2013), Polish filmmaker
 Ewa Serwa (born 1956), Polish actress
 Ewa Strömberg (1940–2013), Swedish actress
 Ewa Wiśniewska (born 1942), Polish actress
 Ewa Ziętek (born 1953), Polish actress

Other fields 
 Ewa Bąkowska (1962–2010), Polish librarian and activist
 Ewa Białołęcka (born 1967), Polish fantasy writer
 Ewa Kubicka, Polish mathematician
 Ewa Kucharczyk (born 1967), Polish teacher
 Ewa Kurek (born 1951), Polish historian
 Ewa Lajer-Burcharth, Polish art historian
 Ewa Milewicz (born 1948), Polish journalist
 Ewa Minge (born 1967), Polish fashion designer
 Ewa Misiak (born 1984), Polish economist
 Ewa Miszewska (1917–1972), Polish Navy officer
Ewa Pachucka (1936–2020), Polish-Australian textile artist and sculptor
 Ewa Paradies (1920–1946), Nazi concentration camp overseer executed for war crimes
 Ewa Partum (born 1945), Polish artist
 Ewa Józefina Julia Potocka (1818–1895), Polish noble
 Ewa Skoog Haslum (born 1968), Swedish Navy officer
 Ewa Szelburg-Zarembina (1899–1986), Polish writer
 Ewa Tarsia, Polish-Canadian digital artist
 Ewa Thompson (born 1950), Polish-American slavicist
 Ewa Zawadzka (born 1950), Polish graphic artist

Fictional characters 
 Ewa Cybulska, a fictional Polish in the 2013 film The Immigrant

See also 
 Eva (name)
 Eve (name)

Polish feminine given names
Scandinavian feminine given names